Eight teams will qualify for the Olympic baseball tournament. The host nation qualifies automatically. Additionally, two teams will qualify from the American qualifying tournament, and one team will qualify from both the European and Asian qualifying tournaments.  The field will be rounded out by the top three teams from the world Olympic qualifying tournament. The qualifications were held in Taichung, Barcelona, and Havana.

Table

Note

American qualifying tournament

Qualifying round
North and Central America

Schedule

Caribbean

South America

Notes

Preliminary round
Group A

Group B

Schedule

Final round

Oceania Qualifying Tournament
With  withdrawing from the tournament,  received an automatic berth into the World Qualifying Tournament.

Schedule

European Qualifying Tournament

Qualifying round 1

Group A

Group B

Group C

Group D

Qualifying round 2

European Baseball Championship

The European Baseball Championship in Barcelona, Spain served as the qualifying competition for the 2008 Summer Olympics. The Netherlands won the tournament for the fifth consecutive time and qualified for the 2008 Summer Olympics in Beijing. Great Britain and Spain advanced to a final qualifying tournament in Taiwan. Prior to the tournament, Greece was removed by the European Baseball Confederation and replaced with Austria. Czech Republic was downgraded to the last place at the end of the tournament and its wins in the preliminary round vacated.

Preliminary round

Group A

September 8
 1 - 9 
 0 - 9* 
 0 - 22 (5 inn.) 
September 9
 2 - 11 
 10 - 0 (7 inn.) 
 11 - 0 (7 inn.) 
September 10
 14 - 2 (7 inn.) 
 0 - 9* 
 8 - 7 
September 11
 6 - 3 
 3 - 8 
 1 -  2 
September 12
 6 - 1 
 0 - 13 (7 inn.) 
 4 - 1 

* The Czech Republic's 4-1 and 6-2 victories over Croatia and Austria were vacated and the results recorded as 9-0 forfeits.

Group B

September 7
 12 - 8 
September 8
 0 - 13 (8 inn.) 
 4 - 2 
September 9
 5 - 4 
 1 - 5 
 7 - 10 
September 10
 6 - 2 
 4 - 0 
 6 - 0 
September 11
 3 - 4 
 4 - 3 (11 inn.) 
 4 - 6 
September 12
 2 - 7 
 9 - 0 
 6 - 2

Final round

* Tiebreakers: 1) W-L in games among tied teams 2) Runs against per 1 defensive inning among tied teams 3) Earned Runs against per 1 defensive inning among tied teams
September 14
 18 - 0 (7 inn.)
 3 - 11 
 7 - 10 
September 15
 10 - 0 (7 inn.) 
 8 - 10 (11 inn.) 
 5 - 7 
September 16
 7 - 1 
 5 - 8 
 6 - 1

Classification
September 13
Seventh Place Game
 2 - 7 
Ninth Place Game
 2 - 1 
Eleventh Place Game
 2 - 7

2007 Asian Championship
The IBAF and IOC recognize Taiwan as Chinese Taipei. Internationally, the team plays as the Chinese Taipei National baseball team, however are referred to, in the country, as the Taiwan National baseball team and use the flag .

B Level

Schedule

A Level

Schedule

African Qualifying Tournament

Schedule

Note: The final game between Lesotho and Nigeria was dependent on whether it had any impact upon the final standings. As South Africa had clinched the championship before the game was to begin, it was cancelled.

Final Qualifying Tournament

The final qualifying tournament will feature the third and fourth place teams from the Americas qualifying tournament, the second and third place teams from the Asian and European qualifying tournaments, and the Oceanian and African continental champions. However, European runner-up Great Britain withdrew from the tournament and were replaced by the fourth place team Germany.

Qualified Teams
  (Americas 3rd)
  (Americas 4th)
  (Europe 3rd)
  (Europe 4th; Replace Europe 2nd Great Britain that withdrew from the tournament)
  (Asia 2nd)
  (Asia 3rd)
  (Oceania 1st)
  (Africa 1st)

Standings

Schedule

See also
 List of sporting events in Taiwan

References

Qualification for the 2008 Summer Olympics
 
2005 in baseball
2006 in baseball
2007 in baseball
2008 in baseball